Nahuel Pereyra (born 18 December 1991) is an Argentinean footballer who now plays for Estudiantes de Buenos Aires in his home country.

Career
Pereyra started his senior career with Club Atlético Brown. After that, he played for Mons Calpe S.C. In 2019. he signed for Estudiantes de Buenos Aires in the Argentinean Primera B Nacional, where he has made twelve appearances and scored one goal.

References

External links 
 "The passion with which we Argentines live soccer is highlighted"
 A Brownian on the loose in Gibraltar
 Pereyra: "When everyone gives you good references, you don't doubt it"
 Nahuel Pereyra: "Brown deserved to win because it generated more situations"
 "The win helped a lot"

Living people
1991 births
Argentine footballers
Association football defenders
Club Atlético Brown footballers
Estudiantes de Buenos Aires footballers